"Atlantic City" is a song written and recorded by Bruce Springsteen, which first appeared on Springsteen's 1982 solo album Nebraska.  Springsteen has often played the song in a full band arrangement in concert.

Background
Springsteen first recorded two demos of the song in April 1981 at his home in Colts Neck, New Jersey. Initially he titled the song "Fistful of Dollars" (from the Clint Eastwood movie A Fistful of Dollars). He recorded another demo in late 1981, this time changing the title to "Atlantic City". He recorded at least five  takes on his Portastudio at Colts Neck during a two-week period, December 17 to January 3, 1982, with take three chosen for Nebraska. In a letter to Jon Landau, Springsteen noted that "this song should probably be done with the whole band really rockin' out". At The Power Station on April 26–28, 1982, with the E Street Band during the 'Electric Nebraska' sessions, Springsteen spent three days trying to make a rock record out of the demo. Landau insisted on releasing the solo version, "No way was it as good as what he had goin' on that demo tape".

History

Springsteen wrote in his Greatest Hits sleeve notes that he recorded the track in his bedroom "for $1,050 (the cost of the four-track Tascam recorder), mixed through an old Gibson guitar unit to a beat box". He provides the vocals, guitar, harmonica, and mandolin for the song.

The song depicts a young couple's escape to Atlantic City, New Jersey, but it also wrestles with the inevitability of death as the man in the relationship intends to take a job in organized crime upon arriving in the city, partially due to desperation caused by his “debts.” The opening lines of "Atlantic City" refer to the then-recent Mafia violence in nearby Philadelphia, with Springsteen singing: "Well, they blew up the chicken man in Philly last night/Now they blew up his house too." The "Chicken Man" refers to Philadelphia crime family boss Phil "the Chicken Man" Testa, who was killed by a rival gangster who planted a nail bomb in his Philadelphia rowhouse in March 1981. While Atlantic City is considered the turf of the Philadelphia crime family, there was considerable in-fighting at the time among the Italian-American Mafia for dominance of the organized crime rackets in the city following the city's proposed legalization of gambling in 1976. By the 1970s and early 80s, Atlantic City had experienced a significant decline from its heyday as a prominent resort town in the early 20th century, and the introduction of legal gambling was proposed as a potential means of reviving the economically struggling city. The song evokes the widespread uncertainty regarding legalized gambling during its early years in Atlantic City and its promises to resurrect the city, as well as the young man's uncertainty about taking the less-than-savory job: "Everything dies, baby, that's a fact, but maybe everything that dies someday comes back."

The song is also included on his 1995 Greatest Hits album and on the 2003 compilation The Essential Bruce Springsteen. "8 Years", a 2006 episode of the television series Cold Case, was based around nine Springsteen songs, with "Atlantic City" played during its climactic murder scene. In 2012 following Hurricane Sandy, New Jersey Governor Chris Christie quoted the song's chorus during a cameo on Saturday Night Live.

The song plays over the opening of episode 3 of season 4 of Billions. A few scenes later, the character "Dollar" Bill Stern (played by Kelly AuCoin) sings the opening lines of the song.

In September 2021, Rolling Stone ranked the song No. 289 on its list of the “500 Best Songs of All Time”.

Music video
A music video, directed by Barry Ralbag, was produced for "Atlantic City", which received moderate play on MTV in the United States. Springsteen does not appear in the video, which features stark, black-and-white images of Atlantic City. The video also contained clips of the demolition of the main dome of the Marlborough-Blenheim Hotel.

Live performances 
From the Born in the U.S.A. Tour on, "Atlantic City" has made fairly regular appearances in Springsteen's band concerts, with a soft-hard-cycle arrangement very similar to that of "Darkness on the Edge of Town".
Such live versions appear on Springsteen's In Concert/MTV Plugged (1993) and Live in New York City (2001) albums. For the 2006 Bruce Springsteen with The Seeger Sessions Band Tour, "Atlantic City" was drastically rearranged and featured multiple outros; as such it appears on the Live in Dublin (2007) album.

Personnel
According to authors Philippe Margotin and Jean-Michel Guesdon:

Bruce Springsteen – vocals, guitar, harmonica, mandolin

Other versions 
The Band covered the song for their 1993 album Jericho. Rolling Stone called it a "clear highlight". After the Band split up, Levon Helm continued to perform "Atlantic City" in his solo performances.

Rock outfit The Hold Steady covered the song on the War Child soundtrack in 2009.

Country artist Riley Green covered the song on his 2018 EP County Line.

Greensky Bluegrass performs the song live.

Country singer John Anderson recorded the song on his 2001 album, Nobody's Got It All.

English singer song-writer, Jamie T, covered the song on his 2010 EP "Emily's Heart".

St. Louis-based folk duo River Kittens recorded the song and released an accompanying video in 2021.

Hank Williams III covered the song on his 2002 album Lovesick, Broke and Driftin'.

Jason Isbell and the 400 Unit covered the song on their 2017 album Live from Welcome to 1979.

References

External links
Single covers from the Netherlands, Italy, Spain, UK and Japan
Review on AllMusic

1982 singles
Culture of Atlantic City, New Jersey
The Band songs
Bruce Springsteen songs
Columbia Records singles
Songs written by Bruce Springsteen
1982 songs
Song recordings produced by Bruce Springsteen